Podaraki is a Greek dancing song from the region of Pontos. The dance dates to the 10th century. It is now danced in modern-day Turkey as well as the northern Thrace. 

It is danced both by men and women usually in an open circle, and rarely in straight line. It's a female song, also called , meaning "go girls for dance." In the song, a supposed girl calls the other girls to go dancing and to have fun before marrying. In its second half, after expressing the traditional criticism against both her husband and her mother and father-in-law for not letting her go dance and have fun, the supposed girl explains how she avenges both them and her children for that.

References

External links

See also
Greek folk music
Greek dances
Tropanka

Greek dances
Pomak dances
Pontic Greek dances